Xiangyang Township is a township under the administration of Zhaodong, Heilongjiang, China. , it has 9 villages under its administration.

References 

Township-level divisions of Heilongjiang
Zhaodong